These datasets are applied for machine learning (ML) research and have been cited in peer-reviewed academic journals. Datasets are an integral part of the field of machine learning. Major advances in this field can result from advances in learning algorithms (such as deep learning), computer hardware, and, less-intuitively, the availability of high-quality training datasets. High-quality labeled training datasets for supervised and semi-supervised machine learning algorithms are usually difficult and expensive to produce because of the large amount of time needed to label the data. Although they do not need to be labeled, high-quality datasets for unsupervised learning can also be difficult and costly to produce.

Many organizations including  governments publish and share their datasets . The datasets are classified, based on the licenses, as Open data and Non-Open data.

The datasets from  various governmental-bodies are presented in List of open government data sites. The datasets are ported on open data portals. They are made available for searching, depositing and accessing through interfaces like Open API.  The datasets are made available as various sorted types and subtypes.

List of sorting used for Datasets 

The data portal is classified based on its type of license. The open source license based data portals are known as open data portals which are used by many government organizations and academic institutions.

List of Open Data Portals

List of portals suitable for multiple types of ML applications 
The data portal sometimes lists a wide variety of subtypes of datasets pertaining to many machine learning applications.

List of portals suitable for a specific subtype of ML application 
The data portals which are suitable for a specific subtype of  machine learning application are listed in the subsequent sections.

Image data 
These datasets consist primarily of images or videos for tasks such as object detection, facial recognition, and multi-label classification.

Facial recognition 
In computer vision, face images have been used extensively to develop facial recognition systems, face detection, and many other projects that use images of faces.

Action recognition

Object detection and recognition

Handwriting and character recognition

Aerial images

Underwater images

Other images

Text data 
These datasets consist primarily of text for tasks such as natural language processing, sentiment analysis, translation, and cluster analysis.

Reviews

News articles

Messages

Twitter and tweets

Dialogues

Legal

Other text

Sound data 
These datasets consist of sounds and sound features used for tasks such as speech recognition and speech synthesis.

Speech

Music

Other sounds

Signal data 
Datasets containing electric signal information requiring some sort of signal processing for further analysis.

Electrical

Motion-tracking

Other signals

Physical data 
Datasets from physical systems.

High-energy physics

Systems

Astronomy

Earth science

Other physical

Biological data 
Datasets from biological systems.

Human

Animal

Fungi

Plant

Microbe

Drug Discovery

Anomaly data

Question Answering data 
This section includes datasets that deals with structured data.

Dialog or Instruction Prompted data 
This section includes datasets that ...

Cybersecurity

Climate and Sustainability

Code data

Multivariate Data

Financial

Weather

Census

Transit

Internet

Games

Other multivariate

Curated repositories of datasets 
As datasets come in myriad formats and can sometimes be difficult to use, there has been considerable work put into curating and standardizing the format of datasets to make them easier to use for machine learning research.

 OpenML: Web platform with Python, R, Java, and other APIs for downloading hundreds of machine learning datasets, evaluating algorithms on datasets, and benchmarking algorithm performance against dozens of other algorithms.
 PMLB: A large, curated repository of benchmark datasets for evaluating supervised machine learning algorithms. Provides classification and regression datasets in a standardized format that are accessible through a Python API.
Metatext NLP: https://metatext.io/datasets web repository maintained by community, containing nearly 1000 benchmark datasets, and counting. Provides many tasks from classification to QA, and various languages from English, Portuguese to Arabic.
Appen: Off The Shelf and Open Source Datasets hosted and maintained by the company. These biological, image, physical, question answering, signal, sound, text, and video resources number over 250 and can be applied to over 25 different use cases.

See also 
 Comparison of deep learning software
 List of manual image annotation tools
 List of biological databases

References